Precision Castparts Corp. is an American industrial goods and metal fabrication company that manufactures investment castings, forged components, and airfoil castings for use in the aerospace, industrial gas turbine, and defense industries. In 2009 it ranked 362nd on the Fortune 500 list, and 11th in the aerospace and defense industry. In 2015 it ranked 322nd overall and 9th in the aerospace and defense industry. In 2014 it ranked 133rd on the S&P 500 based on market capitalization. In January 2016, the company became a subsidiary of Berkshire Hathaway. Before that event, it used to be one of the three Fortune 500 companies headquartered in Oregon.

History
Precision Castparts (PCC) was founded by Joseph Buford Cox on April 1, 1953. Cox was owner of Oregon Saw Chain and in 1949 had started a casting operation to make saw teeth with assistant general manager Ed Cooley also working on the project. In 1953 Cox separated the two companies and PCC was formed, moving into a new larger facility in 1955, and incorporating the following year with Ed Cooley as one of the owners.

2000s to present
In 2002, Mark Donegan became President and CEO. He received tax breaks from local governments in the Portland metro area in 2006 in exchange for a plant expansion. In 2007, the company purchased Cherry Aerospace to expand their fastener business. After ranking as the 568th largest U.S. company by Fortune in 2007, the company became a Fortune 500 the next year when it ranked 444, and rose to 362 in 2009. It ranked 322 prior to its sale to Berkshire in 2016.

PCC announced the purchase of Carlton Forge Works in October 2009 for $850 million and Primus International Inc. in July 2011 in a $900 million deal. Primus made parts for airplanes, selling their products to both Airbus and Boeing. In May 2012 PCC acquired Centra Industries Inc. a builder of aircraft parts for Boeing, Lockheed Martin, Northrop Grumman, Spirit AeroSystems, Mitsubishi Heavy Industries and Bombardier. They have two plants based in Cambridge, Ontario, Canada. Texas Honing was purchased by PCC in October 2012, followed by the $2.9 billion acquisition of Titanium Metals in November 2012.

On August 10, 2015, the boards of directors of Berkshire Hathaway Inc. and Precision Castparts Corp. unanimously approved a definitive agreement for Berkshire Hathaway to acquire, for $235 per share in cash, all outstanding PCC shares, for a total sum of $37 billion including assumed debt.  The sale was finalized on January 29, 2016, on which date Berkshire Hathaway took ownership of Precision Castparts. In 2021, Berkshire Hathaway took an almost $11 billion writedown on the investment.

Environment
In May 2011, toxic chemicals such as nitrogen dioxide and hydrochloric acid were unexpectedly released at the company's titanium plant on Johnson Creek Blvd, Portland, Oregon. Although four people were hospitalized, nobody was permanently injured from the fumes. Firefighters had difficulty shutting down the plant.

The Toxic 100 Air polluters index from the University of Massachusetts listed Precision Castparts as the number one air polluter in the U.S. in the August 2013 edition, which the company called a flawed study.

Financials

*In millions of US dollars.2007 SEC 10-K Form, page 26. Precision Castparts. Retrieved on May 28, 2008

Listed on the New York Stock Exchange as PCP, the company was part of the S&P 400. In 2007, Precision was moved to the S&P 500 stock index. As seen in the table above, PCP's revenue increased by 52 percent in 2007, to $5.4 billion from $3.5 billion in 2006. Total debt increased by 29 percent, from $677 million in 2006 to $873 million in 2007. The increases in revenue and debt were due in part to a pair of acquisitions in February 2007: GSC Foundries, Inc. (GSC), formerly a competitor to PCP in producing aluminum and steel structural investment castings, and Cherry Aerospace LLC (Cherry), a manufacturer of aerospace blind rivets and blind bolts.

Products
The company manufactures a variety of parts for the aerospace industry including many jet engine components. PCC also makes medical prostheses and parts for other industrial applications such as in the oil industry, in the gas industry, and for use in power generating turbines for producing electricity. They are considered a leader in the manufacturing of both jet engine airfoils and gas turbines used for generating electricity.  The company generates $1.5 million in revenue for each Boeing 787 Dreamliner built. Other products made from the various metals are fasteners, products for the paper industry, parts used in the defense industry, and parts for the automotive industry. PCC's main markets are the United States, Europe, and Asia.

Investment cast
The investment casting segment of Precision Castparts includes PCC Structurals and PCC Airfoils. It manufactures castings for aircraft engines, industrial gas turbine engines, airframes, medical implants, armament, unmanned aerial vehicles, and other industrial applications. They are the market leader in manufacturing large, complex, structural investment castings and the leading manufacturer of airfoil investment castings used in jet engines. The structural casting business manufactures the largest-diameter, nickel-based super-alloy, titanium and stainless steel investment castings in the world.

Forged
The Forged Products segment includes Wyman-Gordon, PCC Energy Group, Titanium Metals Corporation(Timet), and Special Metals Corporation and serves the aerospace and power generation markets. They produce engine components as well as airframe structural components for both military and commercial aircraft. They also produce mechanical and structural tubular products for use in energy markets.

Airframe
The Airframe Products segment includes PCC Fasteners and PCC Aerostructures. It is the leading developer and manufacturer of highly engineered fasteners, fastener systems, aerostructures and precision components primary used in critical aerospace applications. In addition to the aerospace and gas turbine markets, this segment serves the construction, automotive, heavy truck and general industrial markets.

See also
 List of companies based in Oregon

References

1953 establishments in Oregon
2016 mergers and acquisitions
Aerospace companies of the United States
American corporate subsidiaries
Berkshire Hathaway
Companies based in Portland, Oregon
Companies formerly listed on the New York Stock Exchange
Defense companies of the United States
Manufacturing companies established in 1953
Manufacturing companies based in Oregon